U.S. Route 80 (also known as U.S. Highway 80 and US 80) is a U.S. highway that begins in the state of Texas in Dallas at an interchange with I-30. US 80 runs in an east–west direction for most of its length from Dallas to Louisiana. Before the advent of the Interstate Highway System, US 80 through Texas was once a vital link in a major transcontinental highway with the national western terminus being in San Diego, California rather than Dallas. Since 1991, most of US 80 in Texas has been decommissioned in favor of I-10, I-20 and I-30 between the New Mexico state line and its current western terminus.

History
The current route of US 80 in Texas is significantly shorter than it was when the highway was first commissioned in 1927. The highway in Texas used to run from the New Mexico state line, near El Paso, to the Louisiana state line, via Pecos, Odessa, Abilene, Weatherford, Fort Worth, Dallas, Longview and Marshall. Nationally, US 80 ran from Savannah, Georgia to San Diego, California, being a major transcontinental highway. Beginning in the 1950s, much of the highway was bypassed/replaced by the Interstate Highway System. US 80 has been replaced by I-10 from New Mexico to I-20, southwest of Pecos. The rest of the highway has been replaced by I-20 and I-30 from Pecos to Louisiana. Replacement by the Interstates made US 80 an obsolete highway to the southwestern states. Between 1964 and 1989, US 80 was decommissioned entirely within California, Arizona and all of New Mexico outside of Anthony (which is located near the Texas state line). In 1991, the remainder of US 80 in both New Mexico and Texas west of Dallas was decommissioned, bringing the national western terminus to its current location. The old highway west of Dallas has since been replaced by local roads and state highways.

Route description

The current highway begins as a freeway at I-30 (also unsigned US 67) in Dallas, almost in Mesquite. The freeway continues east into Mesquite where it meets I-635 at a stack interchange. East of I-635, the US 80 freeway serves as the northern terminus of SH 352, the main highway into downtown Mesquite. Bisecting Samuell Park, US 80 enters Sunnyvale, then crosses into Kaufman County. The freeway makes a curve to the southeast, skirting the town of Forney. US 80 is the main highway and only freeway serving the town. Though there is no business loop through Forney proper, FM 688, which runs the entire length of Broad Street through town, serves a similar function. On the outskirts of Terrell, US 80 leaves the freeway and becomes a four lane divided highway known as Moore Avenue, intersecting SH 205 on the western edge of town, then SH 34 Bus. and SH 34 in the center of Terrell. The remainder of the freeway between Terrell and I-20 makes up the full route of Spur 557. The entire US 80/Spur 557 freeway was a section of I-20 until 1987, when the Interstate was moved onto a new freeway through Lawson and Heartland. A pair of frontage roads services the entire US 80 segment of the freeway, except for a small area west of Forney, where US 80 crosses a bridge over the East Fork Trinity River.

In Terrell, US 80 serves as the major east–west highway in the town, passing through the town square. US 80 leaves Terrell serving smaller communities, such as Elmo. US 80 intersects SH 19 east of Edgewood. The highway runs in mostly a straight line from Terrell to Mineola, where it intersects US 69 about 30 miles north of Tyler.

US 80 leaves Mineola running in a slight southeast direction towards Longview. From here, the highway turns in a slight northeast direction traveling into Marshall. The highway soon overlaps I-20, leaving the interstate to serve the community of Waskom. The two highways cross into Louisiana, parallel with each other traveling to Shreveport.

Major intersections

Related Routes
U.S. Route 180
Texas State Highway 20
Texas State Highway 180
Texas State Highway 352
Texas State Highway Spur 557
Texas State Highway Spur 580

Notes

References

External links
 
  - Shows the historic extent of US 80 in Texas, including the decommissioned route between Anthony, New Mexico and Dallas.
  - Map of US 80 through Texas prior to its truncation in 1991.
Historic U.S. Highway 80 in East Texas - Web page on the official East Texas website highlighting the active portion of US 80 through the state.
Old Highway 80 Driving Directions by State - Bygone Byways - Website section detailing directions and information on old and current routings of US 80 from Louisiana to California, with three entire sections dedicated to Texas.

 Texas
80
Transportation in Dallas County, Texas
Transportation in Kaufman County, Texas
Transportation in Van Zandt County, Texas
Transportation in Smith County, Texas
Transportation in Wood County, Texas
Transportation in Upshur County, Texas
Transportation in Gregg County, Texas
Transportation in Harrison County, Texas
1927 establishments in Texas